OrbiMed (also known as OrbiMed Advisors) is an American investment firm based in New York City, United States. It is focused on making public and private investments in the Healthcare and Biotechnology industries. OrbiMed is considered to be the largest dedicated healthcare investment firm in the world.

History 
In 1989, S.G Warburg pharmaceutical analysts, Viren Mehta and Samuel Isaly founded Mehta & Isaly, a money-management and research firm. This was the predecessor firm to OrbiMed.

In 1993, the firm made its first private equity investment.

In 1998, Mehta & Isaly split up where Mehta would form Mehta Partners and Isaly would form OrbiMed.

In 2007, OrbiMed expanded into Asia opening offices in Shanghai and Mumbai and in 2010, expanded into the Middle East opening a office in Herzliya, Israel.

In 2011, OrbiMed launched its first health care royalties and credit opportunities fund.

In December 2017, Isaly stepped down from his role as managing partner of OrbiMed due to allegations of sexual harassment by former female employees of OrbiMed.

Business Overview 
OrbiMed is headquartered in New York, with additional offices in San Francisco, Mumbai, Shanghai, Hong Kong and Herzliya.

The firm has three investment strategies:

Public Equity 
OrbiMed manages public equity funds that include long/short equity, event-driven investing and closed-end investment trusts. Investments are in publicly traded companies related to Healthcare and Biotechnology.

Private Equity 
OrbiMed invests in Startup Companies as well as Mature Companies with a Growth Equity strategy.

Private Credit/Royalty 
OrbiMed provides commercial-stage healthcare companies with private debt financing.

Private Equity Funds

North America & Europe

Asia

Israel

Royalty Opportunities

Notable investments 

 AbCellera Biologics
 Acceleron Pharma
 Ambit Biosciences
 California Institute for Quantitative Biosciences
 Cynapsus Therapeutics
 DFINE, Inc.
 Gelesis
 Intercept Pharmaceuticals
 Natera
 OmniGuide
 TigerConnect

References

External links
 www.orbimed.com (Company Website)

Financial services companies established in 1989
Hedge funds
Private equity firms of the United States
Venture capital firms